Bagmati River is a river in Nepal.

Bagmati may also refer to places in Nepal:
 Bagmati, Sarlahi, a municipality in Sarlahi District, Province No. 2, Nepal
 Bagmati Province, Nepal
 Bagmati Rural Municipality (disambiguation)
 Bagmati, Lalitpur, a rural municipality in Bagmati Pradesh, Nepal
 Bagmati, Makwanpur, a rural municipality in Bagmati Province, Nepal
 Bagmati Zone, a former zone in Nepal

See also 
 Bhagmati  (disambiguation)